Nicolas Wildhaber (8 December 1929 – 26 September 2020) was a Swiss breaststroke swimmer. He competed at the 1948 Summer Olympics and the 1960 Summer Olympics.

References

External links
 

1929 births
2020 deaths
Swiss male breaststroke swimmers
Olympic swimmers of Switzerland
Swimmers at the 1948 Summer Olympics
Swimmers at the 1960 Summer Olympics
Sportspeople from Zürich
20th-century Swiss people